Hair highlighting/lowlighting is changing a person's hair color, using lightener or haircolor to lift the level or brightness of hair strands. There are four basic types of highlights: foil highlights, hair painting, frosting, and chunking. Highlights can be any color, as long as it is a lighter level than the surrounding hair. Hair lightened with bleach or permanent color will be permanent until new growth begins to show. Highlighted hair can make the hair appear fuller. Therefore, it is sometimes recommended for people with thin and fine hair. It also a recommended service for achieving better color balance with people that have at least 50% gray, and it also helps to diminish the line of demarcation once the new growth is showing from permanent hair color.

Basic foil highlighting 
Foil highlighting is the process of using foil to separate strands of hair which will be lightened from strands of hair which will remain its natural color. The process is done by applying lightener to the hair that has been woven and separated using an applicator brush. The foil is then folded to protect the hair and surrounding area during the processing time. This is the amount of time required to achieve the desired results. In highlighting hair, hydrogen peroxide mixed with pigment is used to change the color of the strand. This process is also used in applying lowlights to the hair. In this process, hair dyes are used to create strands of hair that are darker than the natural color.

Hair painting 

Hair painting is a method of highlighting hair that uses free-handed technique to achieve a highlighted effect. Hair painting methods are permanent and employ a hair-painting brush. Foils, plastic wrap, paper, or cotton may be used to separate lightened hair from non-lightened hair. While brushes are commonly used in hair painting, one may also use combs to paint or highlight thin-sized strands of hair. 
Balayage (from the French, meaning 'scanning, sweeping') is a technique of free-form painting on clean, styled hair. The results are subtle, and thus more natural-looking than foiling or chunking. Balayage in its many variations is currently trending in Hollywood.
Leopard hair highlights, or leopard hair print, consists of creating hair highlights with a leopard pattern. The process of creating leopard spots is done by first bleaching in spots and then coloring the outer parts of the bleached spots with a brown dye. It is also common to use fashion colors for this effect. This type of hair process started as a trend in urban street fashion and is often combined with eccentric haircuts. It is possible to apply a leopard hair print both on long or short hair. Another similar motif used is the cheetah hair pattern.

Frosting 

Frosting is a process of lightening strands of hair while leaving the adjacent hairs untreated. A highlighting cap may be used with this technique. Hair is pulled through holes in the cap and that hair is then lightened. The effects of this can give the hair a look that is "salt and pepper" with a decent amount of hair left untreated. It will create a stark contrast between the colors and will usually not resemble natural highlights. This is a popular technique for those with shorter hair.

Chunking  
Chunking is a style of highlight which is larger and thicker than a traditional highlight, rather than a method of creating highlights. Chunky highlights are generally offered in a wider variety of bold natural colors, as well as a large number of artificial, or unnatural, colors and are used to create more contrast, rather than subtle texture, as in traditional, thinner highlights.

See also
 List of hairstyles

References 

Hair coloring

ru:Окрашивание волос#Мелирование